"Rubbin Off the Paint" is the debut single by American rapper YBN Nahmir. It was originally released on Nahmir's SoundCloud account on August 21, 2017, but was released for digital download and streaming on September 18, 2017. The single peaked at number 46 on the US Billboard Hot 100, and was certified gold by the RIAA in May 2018. Since then, the single has been certified 2x platinum by the RIAA.

Background
The song was recorded in Simmons' bedroom with a $50 Blue Snowball microphone and a sock covering it to act as a pop filter. The song was produced by a Swedish record producer Izak. After the success of the song, Simmons was pulled out of school due to his exceptional popularity and forced to start online classes. The song debuted at #79 on the Billboard Hot 100 and peaked at number 46.

Music video
Simmons premiered the official music video for "Rubbin Off the Paint" on September 18, 2017 on WorldStarHipHop's YouTube channel. The video for the song was directed in one take due to Simmons having school the following day. The song quickly went viral with Simmons explaining it as "blowing up overnight." Its music video currently has over 207 million views on YouTube.

Charts

Weekly charts

Year-end charts

Certifications

References

2017 songs
2017 singles
Southern hip hop songs
Trap music songs
YBN Nahmir songs